Piero Gorgatto (7 January 1925 – 7 September 1991) was an Italian sailor who competed in the 1956 Summer Olympics.

References

External links
 

1925 births
Year of death missing
Italian male sailors (sport)
Olympic sailors of Italy
Sailors at the 1956 Summer Olympics – Dragon